Celeste Beard Johnson (born February 13, 1963), more commonly known as Celeste Beard, is an American convicted murderer who is serving a life sentence at the Lane Murray (SHU) in Gatesville, Texas, for the 1999 murder of her millionaire husband, Steven Beard.

Background
Celeste Johnson's biological parents are unknown. She met her birth mother only one time and was told, "I am not your mother, I was just your incubator." She claimed that her adoptive parent, Edwin Johnson, physically abused her as a child and that she attempted suicide during puberty. At age 17, Johnson became pregnant and gave birth to twins, Jennifer and Kristina, with her abusive first husband, Craig Bratcher. Bratcher committed suicide in 1996.

Johnson married twice more before meeting Steven Beard while she was a waitress at a country club in Austin, Texas. Beard, a retired Fox Broadcasting executive and self-made multi-millionaire more than twice her age, was a widower whose wife had died of cancer. Johnson moved in with Beard after he convinced her that he would legally adopt her daughters. They were married on February 18, 1995, with Beard's family and friends suspicious that Johnson had married him for his money.

Husband's murder
On October 3, 1999, Beard was shot in the stomach while he was asleep at their home in Westlake Hills, Texas. Beard was later released from the hospital, but succumbed to a blood clot on January 22, 2000. Local police tied the shooting to Tracey Tarlton, who Johnson had met at Saint David’s Pavilion, a mental health facility, after Johnson was admitted for depression. Tarlton confessed to the shooting and was arrested at home six days after the shooting, was charged with assault. The police began to hear that Johnson had spoken negatively about Beard. Their attorney, David Kuperman, refused to allow police to interview Beard while he was hospitalized, due to his grave condition.

Tarlton remained silent until July 2000, when she read in a local newspaper that Johnson had remarried six months after Beard’s death and realized that their relationship was a sham. Shortly before her murder trial began in March 2002, Tarlton told police that Johnson had persuaded her to shoot Beard, claiming that he had emotionally abused Johnson to the point of suicide. Tarlton was determined that getting rid of him was the only way the women could be together. Johnson has vehemently denied this persuasion.

Trial
Based on Tarlton's statement, Johnson was arrested on March 28, 2002. At Johnson's trial, prosecutors charged that she had married Beard for his money and wanted him dead because he was tired of her extravagant spending and was considering divorce. The Beard attorney, David Kuperman, testified that Steven did not want a divorce and the underlying issues of the spending were addressed during joint therapy (both Beards in attendance) sessions treating Johnson's depression. According to Beard's accountant, Johnson spent $321,000 in October and November 1999, an additional $249,000 by December 10 and another $100,000 in the six weeks ending March 31, 2000.

Johnson's attorney, Dick DeGuerin, alleged that she had nothing to do with the shooting and that Tarlton, whom he dismissed as an unreliable witness due to documented mental instability,  acted alone; Tarlton was obsessed with Johnson, who denied making sexual advances toward her. According to Johnson and several witnesses, Tarlton tried to kiss her after she had passed out during her daughters' 1999 high school graduation. When Tarlton was arrested for drunk driving and Johnson bailed her out, Beard, angered by the relentless phone calls, demanded that Tarlton stop contacting the couple. Several witnesses saw no unusual problems in Johnson and Beard's marriage, and DeGuerin alleged that Johnson's daughters lied on the witness stand because they would inherit no money if their mother was acquitted. Kristina was adverse during her testimony, answering to the defense, "I do not remember," 298 times.

In 2003, Johnson was convicted of capital murder, under The Texas Law of Parties, receiving a mandatory life sentence. She will be eligible for parole on April 1, 2042. Tarlton received a 10-year reduced sentence in exchange for testifying against Johnson, and was released on parole in August 2011 and lives in San Antonio.

In the media
The case was covered on such news documentaries and true crime programs as American Justice, Snapped (1st episode), Deadly Women, Vengeance: Killer Millionaires, Reasonable Doubt, and ABC's 20/20. Previously unrevealed information about the lives, the crime, and the trial in the exclusive biography, The Celeste Beard Johnson Story, was released in 2019.

Johnson and five other inmates published From the Big House to Your House, a cookbook that lists recipes that can be made in prison cells with ingredients from the prison commissary.

In 2017, Celeste's daughter, Jennifer, was wounded after a shooting while attending a Halloween party. She had to undergo more than ten surgeries but survived.

On June 13, 2021, Lifetime aired Secrets of a Gold Digger Killer, a TV film that featured Julie Benz as Celeste.

In 2022, ABC aired two episodes titled "What the Sisters Saw - Part 1 & 2" on the show Who Do You Believe?. The show featured interviews with Celeste, her two daughters, and other people in the case.

See also

Other murders in the Austin area:
 1991 Austin yogurt shop murders 
 Murder of Jennifer Cave
 Murders of John Goosey and Stacy Barnett

References

Further reading

Celeste: The Celeste Beard Johnson Story by Nancy Hall and W.R. Mesiano

External links
pro-Celeste Beard website
archived (2012) Free Celeste website
Witnesses during the trial of Celeste Beard
Celeste Beard at Crime Library

1963 births
American female murderers
American people convicted of murder
American prisoners sentenced to life imprisonment
Bisexual women
LGBT people from California
Living people
1999 murders in the United States
People convicted of murder by Texas
Prisoners sentenced to life imprisonment by Texas
Mariticides
20th-century American criminals
Wealth in the United States
People from Santa Barbara, California
20th-century American LGBT people
21st-century American LGBT people